Xhorxhian Boçi (born 14 February 1994) is an Albanian footballer who plays as a defender for Dinamo Tirana in the Albanian First Division.

References

1994 births
Living people
People from Delvinë
People from Vlorë County
Albanian footballers
Association football defenders
KF Delvina players
KF Adriatiku Mamurrasi players
FC Kamza players
KS Iliria players
FK Dinamo Tirana players
Kategoria e Dytë players
Kategoria e Parë players
Kategoria Superiore players